John Duffy (born 6 September 1943) is a Scottish former footballer who played as a left half in the Scottish League for Raith Rovers and Dunfermline Athletic and in the English Football League for Darlington. He then played in the Victoria State League for Slavia Melbourne and for Sydney Hakoah in New South Wales Division 1, earning representative honours for both states.

References

1943 births
Living people
Footballers from Dunfermline
Scottish footballers
Association football wing halves
Raith Rovers F.C. players
Fulham F.C. players
Dunfermline Athletic F.C. players
Darlington F.C. players
Scottish Football League players
English Football League players
Scottish expatriates in Australia
Expatriate soccer players in Australia